Blairsden is a historic , 38-room mansion located in Peapack-Gladstone, New Jersey. In addition to its 38 rooms, the mansion has 25 fireplaces and 19 bathrooms.

History

Blairsden was built between 1897 and 1903 for Clinton Ledyard Blair (1867–1949), an American investment banker. It was designed by the prominent architectural firm of Carrère and Hastings.  Blair spared no expense in building Blairsden, including leveling off the mountain, building a funicular to shuttle building materials and later guests up and down the terraced mountain and purchasing trees and shrubs aged 25-50 years old, as he did not wish "to wait for things to grow."  Blairsden also included a 300-ft reflecting pool decorated with a surround of busts of the Roman Emperors.  The household employed a large staff  of over 70 to support the household and grounds.

Sisters of St. John the Baptist
After Blair's death in 1949, the mansion was sold to the Sisters of St. John the Baptist, who operated the house as a religious retreat. In 2002, the Sisters of St. John the Baptist sold the property to the Foundation for Classical Architecture, owned by Victor Shafferman.

Present day
The mansion was subsequently listed for sale and sold in 2012 for $4.5 million to a holding company named Blairsden Hall, LLC. Local officials identified the new owner as T. Eric Galloway, a New York developer and president of the Galvan Foundation and the Lantern Organization.  

In May 2014, Blairsden was the site of the 2014 "Mansion in May" charity fundraiser designer show house and Gardens. This designer show house was presented by the Women's Association of Morristown Medical Center, and it attracted over 33,000 visitors.

The mansion was last sold in 2022 to 30 Blair PG, LLC, a subsidiary of Gladstone-based real estate private equity firm Melillo Equities.

See also
Beaux-Arts architecture

References

Houses in Somerset County, New Jersey 
Houses completed in 1903
Beaux-Arts architecture in New Jersey
Carrère and Hastings buildings
Gilded Age mansions